Lonely House is the second album by Grammatrain.

Track listing
 "She Don't Know" - 2:32
 "Believe" - 3:36
 "Execution" - 3:56
 "Lonely House" - 5:43
 "Psycho" - 5:42
 "Sick of Will" - 3:01
 "Need" - 6:28
 "Drown" - 3:55
 "Undivine Election" - 3:35
 "Jerky Love Song" - 0:40
 "Humanity" - 4:24
 "Picture Pains" - 6:32
 "Apathy" - 2:58

References

Grammatrain albums
1995 albums
ForeFront Records albums